Huw Charles Taylor (born 5 June 1996) is an English rugby union player who plays either at lock or at flanker for the Dragons.

In October 2014, Taylor made his club debut for Worcester against Nottingham in the British and Irish Cup. Taylor went on to be part of the side that defeated Doncaster in the final to win the cup that season.

Taylor has represented England U18s and in the 2016 Six Nations Under 20s Championship. In June 2016, Taylor was a member of the England U20 team that won the Junior World Cup, scoring a try in the final against Ireland.

On 2 May 2017, Taylor signed his first senior contract with Worcester at Sixways Stadium ahead of the 2017-18 season. In January 2018 it was announced that Taylor would be joining Pro14 side Dragons. He is a Welsh-qualified player through a grandparent.

References

External links
Worcester Warriors Profile

1996 births
Living people
Doncaster Knights players
Dragons RFC players
English people of Welsh descent
English rugby union players
London Scottish F.C. players
People educated at Old Swinford Hospital
Rugby union flankers
Rugby union locks
Rugby union players from Bridgnorth
Worcester Warriors players
Bedford Blues players